The Paragominas mine is a large mine located in the northern part of Brazil in Pará. Paragominas represents one of the largest bauxite reserve in Brazil and one of the largest in South America, having estimated reserves of 1 billion tonnes.

References 

Bauxite mines in Brazil